Alfred William Messenger (born 4 December 1887 - 1968) was a British gymnast who competed in the 1912 Summer Olympics. He was born in Birmingham, West Midlands.

He was part of the British team, which won the bronze medal in the gymnastics men's team, European system event in 1912.
Following his 1912 medal win he retired from gymnastics and went back to his profession of cabinet making. He enlisted in the army in 1915 and went on to serve in France and India.

References

External links
profile

1887 births
1968 deaths
Sportspeople from Birmingham, West Midlands
British male artistic gymnasts
Gymnasts at the 1912 Summer Olympics
Olympic gymnasts of Great Britain
Olympic bronze medallists for Great Britain
Olympic medalists in gymnastics
Medalists at the 1912 Summer Olympics